Viktor Gnezdilov (17 January 1943 – 13 December 2021) was a Russian politician. A member of United Russia, he served as mayor of Nakhodka from 1987 to 2004.

References

1943 births
2021 deaths
20th-century Russian politicians
21st-century Russian politicians
United Russia politicians
Mayors of places in Russia
People from Nakhodka